George John Rehring (June 10, 1890 – February 29, 1976) was an American prelate of the Roman Catholic Church. He served as bishop of the Diocese of Toledo in Ohio from 1950 to 1967.  He previously served as an auxiliary bishop of the Archdiocese of Cincinnati in Ohio from 1937 to 1950.

Biography

Early life and education 
Rehring was born on June 10, 1890, in Cincinnati, Ohio, to Bernard L. and Mary A. (née Sander) Rehring. He attended St. Gregory's Preparatory Seminary and Mount St. Mary's Seminary, both in Cincinnati.

Priesthood 
Rehring was ordained to the priesthood by Archbishop Henry Moeller for the Archdiocese of Cincinnati on March 28, 1914. He served as a curate at St. Mary's Parish in Hillsboro, Ohio, before being assigned to SS. Peter and Paul Parish in Reading, Ohio. In 1921, he received his first pastorate at Guardian Angels Parish in Cincinnati.

Rehring became professor of theology at Mount St. Mary's Seminary in 1923. From 1926 to 1928, he continued his studies at the Pontifical University of St. Thomas Aquinas, Angelicum in Rome, where he earned a Doctor of Sacred Theology degree. He served as rector of Mount St. Mary's Seminary from 1931 to 1940. He was named a domestic prelate in 1932.

Auxiliary Bishop of Cincinnati 
On August 6, 1937, Rehring was appointed auxiliary bishop of the Archdiocese of Cincinnati and titular bishop of Lunda by Pope Pius XI. He received his episcopal consecration on October 7, 1937, from Archbishop John T. McNicholas, with Bishops Joseph H. Albers and Urban John Vehr serving as co-consecrators. As an auxiliary bishop, he served as pastor of St. Mary's Parish in the Hyde Park section of Cincinnati from 1940 to 1950.

Bishop of Toledo 
Rehring was named the fourth bishop of the Diocese of Toledo by Pope Pius XII on July 16, 1950. Rehring attended all four sessions of the Second Vatican Council in Rome between 1962 and 1965. On February 25, 1967, Pope Paul VI accepted Rehring's resignation as bishop of Toledo and appointed him titular bishop of Tunnuna, a post he resigned on December 31, 1970.

George Rehring died on February 29, 1976, at age 85.

References 

1890 births
1976 deaths
The Athenaeum of Ohio alumni
Roman Catholic Archdiocese of Cincinnati
Roman Catholic bishops of Toledo
20th-century Roman Catholic bishops in the United States
Participants in the Second Vatican Council
Religious leaders from Cincinnati
Roman Catholic Diocese of Toledo
Roman Catholic titular bishops of Tunnuna